Sussex Asahi Division 4 East is an English level 12 Rugby Union League. It is run by the Sussex Rugby Football Union and contains teams predominantly from east Sussex and is the counterpart to Sussex Late Red Division 4 West which is for teams in the west of the county. Teams play home and away matches from September to April. Promoted teams move up to Sussex Oranjeboom Division 3 while there is no relegation.

Sussex Asahi Division 4 East Honours

See also
Sussex RFU
English rugby union system
Rugby union in England

References

External links
Sussex Rugby

Rugby union leagues in England